Glyder is an electoral ward in the city of Bangor, Gwynedd, Wales, electing councillors to the city council and Gwynedd Council.

Description
The ward covers the western corner of the city on the Menai Strait, including three schools and several college campuses. In the westernmost corner of the ward is the Menai Suspension Bridge to Anglesey. The ward is partially bounded to the northwest by the A5 road, to the southeast by the Penrhos Road. Bangor University's Neuadd Reichel building is in the very northernmost corner.

The ward population, according to the 2011 Census, was 1,777.

City ward
Glyder is a ward to Bangor City Council electing three of the twenty city councillors.

County ward
Glyder has been an electoral ward to Gwynedd Council since 1995, electing one county councillor. At the 1995 and 1999 elections the ward was represented by an Independent. Since 2004 it has been represented by Plaid Cymru.

At a by-election in May 2011, Plaid Cymru only narrowly won the contest from the Liberal Democrats, by 13 votes. In the May 2012 county council election Plaid's Elin Walker Jones retained the seat with an increased 32 vote majority over the Lib Dems.

See also
 List of electoral wards in Gwynedd
 Deiniol (electoral ward)
 Hendre (Bangor electoral ward)

References

Bangor, Gwynedd
Gwynedd electoral wards